The following is a list of releases by the English post-punk band the Television Personalities, who formed in 1977.

Albums

...And Don't the Kids Just Love It (1981, Rough Trade)
Mummy Your Not Watching Me (1982, Whaam! Records)
They Could Have Been Bigger than the Beatles (1982, Whaam! Records)
The Painted Word (1984, Illuminated Records)
Privilege (1989, Fire Records)
Closer to God (1992, Fire Records)
I Was a Mod Before You Was a Mod (1995, Overground Records)
Don't Cry Baby, It's Only a Movie (1998, Damaged Goods Records )
My Dark Places (2006, Domino)
Are We Nearly There Yet? (2007, Overground Records)
A Memory Is Better Than Nothing (2010, Rocket Girl)
Beautiful Despair (2017, Fire Records)

Live

Chocolat-Art (A Tribute to James Last) (1985, Pastell - live in Germany 1984)
Camping in France (1991, Overground)
Top Gear (1996, Overground)
Made In Japan (1996, Little Teddy Recordings)
Mod Is Dead (1996, Teenage Kicks)
Paisley Shirts & Mini Skirts (1997, Overground - Live at the Hammersmith Clarendon, London 1980)

EPs

Where's Bill Grundy Now? (1978, King's Road)
The Strangely Beautiful (1991, Fire)
How I Learned To Love The Bomb (1994, Overground)

Compilations

Yes Darling, but is it Art? (Early Singles & Rarities) (1995, Fire)
Prime Time 1981-1992 (1997, Nectar Masters)
Part Time Punks – The Very Best of the Television Personalities (1999, Cherry Red)
The Boy Who Couldn't Stop Dreaming (2000, Vinyl Japan)
Fashion Conscious (The Little Teddy Years) (2002, Little Teddy Recordings)
And They All Lived Happily Ever After (2005, Damaged Goods)
Singles 1978-1987 (2007, Vinyl Japan)

Singles

"14th Floor" (1978 - Side A: "14th Floor", Side B: "Oxford St. W.1" - GLC Records - released as Teen '78)
"Smashing Time!" (1980 - Side A: "Smashing Time", Side B: "King and Country" - Rough Trade Records - RT 051)
"I Know Where Syd Barrett Lives"/"Arthur The Gardener" (1981 - Side A: "I Know Where Syd Barrett Lives", Side B: "Arthur The Gardener" - Rough Trade Records - RT 063)
"Painting By Numbers" (1981 - Side A: "Painting By Numbers", Side B: "Lichtenstein Girl" - Whaam! Records - WHAAM 001)
"Three Wishes" (1982 - Side A: "Three Wishes", Side B: "Geoffrey Ingram"/"And Don't The Kids Just Love It!" - Whaam! Records - WHAAM 4 - released as Gifted Children)
"Biff Bang Pow!" (1982 - Side A: "Biff Bang Pow!", Side B: "A Picture of Dorian Grey" - Creation Artifact - 002)
"A Sense of Belonging" (1983 - Side A: "A Sense of Belonging", Side B: "Paradise Estate" - Rough Trade - RT 109)
"How I Learned to Love the Bomb" (1986 - Side A: "How I Learned to Love the Bomb", Side B: "Grocer's Daughter"/"Girl Called Charity" - Dreamworld - Dream 10)
"The Prettiest Girl in the World"/"If That's What Love Is" (1987 - Side A: "The Prettiest Girl in the World", Side B: "If That's What Love Is" - Overground Records - over 15)
"I Still Believe in Magic" (1989 - Side A: "I Still Believe in Magic", Side B: "Respectable" - Caff Corporation - CAFF 5)
"Salvador Dali's Garden Party" (1989 - Side A: "Salvador Dali's Garden Party", Side B: "The Room at the Top of the Stairs" - Fire Records - BLAZE 37S)
"She's Never Read My Poems" (1991 - Side A: "She's Never Read My Poems", Side B: "The Day The Dolphins Leave The Sea"/"Christ Knows, I Have Tried" - Fire Records - BLAZE 44049)
"Your Class"/"Someone To Share My Life With" (1991 - Side A: "Your Class", Side B: "BMX Bandits"/"Someone To Share My Life With"/"Clawfist" - PIG 8 - split with "BMX Bandits", each band covered other band's song)
"We Will Be Your Gurus" (1992 - Side A: "We Will Be Your Gurus", Side B: "An Exhibition By Joan Miro"/"Love Is Better Than War" - Seminal Twang - TWANG 15)
"Favourite Films" (1992 - Side A: "Favourite Films", Side B: "The Dream Inspires"/"Happy All The Time" (Ten Years Ahead Of Its Time version) - Overground Records - Over 27 - from the 1984 Whaam! compilation All for art...and art for all)
"Goodnight Mr Spaceman" (1993 - CD: "Goodnight Mr Spaceman"/"If I Was Your Girl Friend"/"She Loves It When He Sings Like Elvis"/"Goodnight Mr" - Fire Records - BLAZE65CD)
"The Happening" (1995 - Side A: "Jennifer, Julie & Josephine", Side B: "The Bartlebees"/"Why Don't You Smile Now?" - Little Teddy Recordings - LiTe 739 - split with "The Bartlebees")
"Time Goes Slowly When You're Drowning" (1995 - Side A: "Time Goes Slowly When You're Drowning", Side B: "Meanwhile In A Luxury Dockland Home" - Little Teddy Recordings - LiTe 716)
"I Was A Mod Before You Was A Mod" (Easy Mix) (1996 - Side A: "I Was A Mod Before You Was A Mod" (Easy Mix), Side B: "She Lives For The Moment" - Overground Records - OVER50 - Limited edition of 1000)
"Bike" (1996 - Side A: "Bike"/"No One's Little Girl", Side B: "Seasons In The Sun" - TwistRecords - Twis 20)
"Now That I'm A Junkie!" (1996 - Side A: "Now That I'm A Junkie", Side B: "How Does It Feel To Be Loved?" - Little Teddy Recordings - LiTe741)
"When I Grow Up I Want To Be…" (1999 - Side A: "The Boy Who Couldn't Stop Dreaming", Side B: "When I Grow Up I Want To Be…" - Damaged Goods - damgood 170)
"All The Young Children On Crack" (2006 - Side A: "All The Young Children On Crack", Side B: "Any Love Is Good Love" - Domino - RUG220)
"The Good Anarchist" (2008 - Side A: "The Good Anarchist", Side B: "She's Always Been There For Me" - ElefantRecords - ER-256)
"My New Tattoo" (2009 - Side A: "My New Tattoo", Side B: "Funny He Never Married" - Good Village Recordings - GVR 2)
"People Think That We're Strange" (2009 - Side A: "People Think That We're Strange", Side B: "A Glimpse of My Genius" - ElefantRecords - er-269)
"You're My Yoko" (2010 - Side A: "You're My Yoko", Side B: "The Girl From Nowhere" - Rocket Girl - rgirl58)
"Wonder What It Was" (2011 - Side A: "Wonder What It Was", Side B: "Radiohead Song" - Formosa PunkRecords - SHADE 009)

Tributes

"I Don't Know Where Dan Treacy Lives" (2000, Lookout Records) The Mr. T Experience
"If I Could Write Poetry" (2003, The Beautiful Music)
"¡Harte para todos" (2004, Discos Harte) Thy Surfyn' Eyes, TCR, Alpino, Los Part-Time Pops singing TVP's songs in Spanish
"Someone to Share My Life With"  (2005, But Is It Art) Nikki Sudden, Swell Maps, The Shambles, Semion, BMX Bandits, Jonathan Caws-Elwitt and others
"I Would Write A Thousand Words" (2007, The Beautiful Music) Nikki Sudden, The Loch Ness Mouse, The Shambles, Swell Maps, Semion, Superczar, The Airwaves, Jonathan Caws-Elwitt, BMX Bandits and others
"Song For Dan Treacy" MGMT on the album Congratulations.
"Various Artists All Those Times We Spent Together: A Tribute to the TVP" (2010, The Beautiful Music)
"They Could Have Been Bigger Than Hiawata!" (2007, SellOut Music) by the Norwegian pop band Hiawata! is a nametribute/nod to "They Could Have Been Bigger Than The Beatles"

Notes

Discographies of British artists
Punk rock group discographies
Rock music group discographies